The Ministry of Internal Affairs of Tuva is the main policing and law enforcement body in the Republic of Tuva, a region of Eastern Russia. The current Interior Minister is Police Colonel Yury Polyakov, who assumed office in September 2019. It celebrates its professional holiday on 17 March.

Structure
The MVD of Tuva has the following structure:
Investigative Department
Personnel Management
Criminal Investigation Office
Office of Economic Security and Anti-Corruption
Drug Enforcement Administration
Office of the State Road Safety 
Inspectorate
Office of Migration
Forensic Center
Center for Countering Extremism
Center for the Temporary Detention of Juvenile Offenders
Dog Training Center
Information Center
Center for Financial Support
Center for Information Technologies, Communications and Information Protection
Division for Precinct Police and Juvenile Divisions
Department of Interaction with Executive Authorities
Department of Inquiry
Office and Secrecy Department
Legal Department
Department of Information and Public Relations
Operational-Search Unit
State Protection Investigative Unit 
Call center
Separate Company for Guarding Suspects
Headquarters
Rear
Audit Group
Center for Economic and Service Support
Health unit
Council of Veterans

Main Tasks
The main tasks of the Ministry of Internal Affairs are:
 Improvement of legal regulation established in the field;
 The provision within its mandate the protection of the rights and freedoms of man and citizen;
 The organization within its powers the prevention, detection, prevention, detection and investigation of crimes, as well as preventing and combating administrative violations;
 Ensuring the protection of public order;
 Road safety;
 The organization and implementation of state control over arms trafficking;
 Organization under the laws of the Russian Federation State protection of property and institutions;
 Management of internal affairs bodies of the republic, the organization of their activities.
 
Since February 2009, it has been a regional agency of the Ministry of Internal Affairs of the Russian Federation. The MVD of the Republic of Tuva is guided by the Constitution of the Russian Federation, federal constitutional laws, federal laws, Decrees of the President of the Russian Federation and the Government of the Russian Federation.

References

External links
 official website (non-active)

Politics of Tuva
Tuva
Tuva